Muhammad Hamid Abu al-Nasr (25 March 1913 – 20 January 1996) was the fourth General Guide (Murshid al-'am) of the Egyptian Muslim Brotherhood. A controversial choice to lead the group after the 1986 death of longtime General Guide 'Umar al-Tilmisani, al-Nasr was opposed by a large faction backing other candidates such as Salah Shadi or Husayn Kamal al-Din, but was installed as Murshid by Mustafa Mashhur, who succeeded him soon after.
His written book is "Wadi e Neel Ka Qafila Sakht Jaan".

References

Egyptian Muslim Brotherhood leaders
1996 deaths
1913 births